This is a list of cemeteries in Ireland. It includes cemeteries in the Republic of Ireland and Northern Ireland. Only cemeteries which are notable and can be visited are included. Ancient burial grounds are excluded.

Ballybough Cemetery, Dublin - old Jewish cemetery opened in 1718 last burial 1957
Ballyoan Cemetery, Derry
Belfast City Cemetery, Belfast, County Antrim
Bodenstown Graveyard, County Kildare
Bully's Acre, Dublin - former public cemetery near the Royal Hospital Kilmainham
Cabbage Garden, Dublin
Carrickbrennan Churchyard,  Monkstown, County Dublin
Clifton Street Cemetery, Belfast
Cork Jewish Cemetery, Curraghkippane, Cork - members of Cork's Jewish community, and victims of the Luisitania disaster.
Conwal Cemetery, Letterkenny, County Donegal
Croppies' Acre, Dublin - contains a memorial to the dead of the 1798 Rebellion
Deans Grange Cemetery, County Dublin
Dolphins Barn Jewish Cemetery, Dublin - active Jewish cemetery
Donnybrook Cemetery, Donnybrook, Dublin
Drumcondra Church Graveyard, Drumcondra, Dublin - burial place of architect James Gandon and Patrick Heeney (composer of the Irish national anthem)
Friar's Bush Graveyard, Belfast
Friends Burial Ground, Dublin -  a Quaker burial ground in Blackrock, Dublin
Glasnevin Cemetery, Dublin - this cemetery has over 1,500,000 people buried in it - many were victims of the great famine of 1845; there are also many prominent Irish figures buried here such as Michael Collins and Éamon de Valera
Glencree German War Cemetery, Glencree, County Wicklow
Goldenbridge Cemetery, Goldenbridge, Dublin
Grangegorman Military Cemetery, Dublin
Huguenot Cemetery, Cork - 18th century cemetery for the Huguenot inhabitants of Cork city
Huguenot Cemetery, Dublin
Laraghbryan Cemetery, County Kildare
Limerick Jewish graveyard, Castletroy, Limerick
Merrion Cemetery, Bellevue, Dublin
Milltown Cemetery, Belfast, County Antrim
Mount Jerome Cemetery, Dublin
Old Church Cemetery, Cobh, County Cork
Roselawn Cemetery, Belfast
Shanganagh Cemetery, Dublin
St. Finbarr's Cemetery, Cork - Cork city's largest cemetery
St. Fintan's Cemetery, Sutton, Dublin
St. Kevin's Churchyard, Camden Row, Dublin
Tea Lane Graveyard, County Kildare

Ireland
 
 
 
Cemeteries
Cemeteries